Platanus racemosa is a species of plane tree known by several common names, including California sycamore, western sycamore, California plane tree, and in North American Spanish aliso. Platanus racemosa  is native to California and Baja California, where it grows in riparian areas, canyons, floodplains, at springs and seeps, and along streams and rivers in several types of habitats. It can be found as far north as Tehama and Humboldt counties.

Description

The trunk generally divides into two or more large trunks splitting into many branches. The bark is an attractive patchwork of white, tawny beige, pinkish gray, and pale brown, with older bark becoming darker and peeling away. Platanus racemosa is the dominant species in the globally and state endangered sycamore-alluvial woodland habitat.

The large palmately lobed leaves may be up to  centimeters wide and have three or five pointed lobes. New leaves are a bright translucent green and somewhat woolly. The deciduous tree drops copious amounts of dry golden to orangish red leaves in the fall. The inflorescence is made up of a few spherical flower heads each around a centimeter wide. The female flower heads develop into spherical fruit clusters each made up of many hairy, maroon-red-woolly achenes.

The tough and coarse-grained wood is difficult to split and work. It has various uses, including acting as a meat preparation block for butchers. Many small birds feed on its fruit, and several mammals eat its twigs and bark. The pollen and the hairs on leaves and flowers can be allergens for some people. New leaves are susceptible to anthracnose canker, which, when it causes a side bud to become the new leader, can create picturesque angling trunks and branches on older specimens.

Cultivation
It is also widely planted horticulturally as a landscape tree in public landscapes and private gardens. While it requires some water, and can be grown in lawns, once established it is drought tolerant. New appreciation for how it shades sun in summer and lets sun through in winter has led to its use in green architecture and sustainable design. The aesthetics of its bark and its overall form add interest.

See also

Big Sycamore Canyon - a place in Ventura County, California with a population of California sycamore trees

References

External links
 Jepson Manual Treatment
 Photo gallery
 Interactive Distribution Map of Platanus racemosa

racemosa
Flora of California
Flora of the California desert regions
Flora of the Sierra Nevada (United States)
Natural history of the California chaparral and woodlands
Natural history of the California Coast Ranges
Natural history of the Central Valley (California)
Natural history of the Channel Islands of California
Natural history of the Colorado Desert
Natural history of the Peninsular Ranges
Natural history of the San Francisco Bay Area
Natural history of the Santa Monica Mountains
Natural history of the Transverse Ranges
Trees of Baja California
Trees of the Southwestern United States
Trees of Mediterranean climate
Garden plants of North America
Ornamental trees
Flora without expected TNC conservation status